Geoff Levin (born September 14, 1945) is an American rock musician, film/television composer and songwriter. Performing as part of the Black Mountain Boys with Jerry Garcia in the early years of his career, in 1968 his own group, People!, scored a hit record "I Love You" on Capital Records. Together with Geoffrey Lewis in 1970, he created Celestial Navigations, a storytelling group, that produced 8 albums, several made the Billboard (New Age) charts. He co-composed and co-produced "The Janitor", an Academy Award-nominated animated short based on a story by Geoffrey Lewis from the album Celestial Navigations.
Levin has scored over 40 full-length films and has created music used in many TV shows including The Sopranos, Chicago Fire, The Good Wife, Friends, Bloodline, SNL, Game of Thrones, Friday Night Lights, CSI, and Weeds. He co-wrote the theme song for Jakers, an Emmy and BAFTA Award-winning PBS animated series. In addition, he composed music for James Cameron's deep sea documentary, Last Mysteries of the Titanic. In 2007, as part of People!, Levin was inducted into San Jose's Rock and Roll Hall of Fame.

Biography
Levin was born in San Francisco, California, to Manny Levin and Esther Bloom. Levin grew up in San Jose and attended Willow Glen High School. He began playing the guitar at 16 and started performing at 17. He performed regularly at Offstage, a folk club in San Jose founded by Paul Foster that later hosted artists including the Grateful Dead, Jefferson Airplane, Quicksilver Messenger Service, Jorma Kaukonen, Paul Kantner, Jerry Garcia David Freiberg and David Crosby, Odetta, Jesse Fuller, The Albin Brothers (members of Janis Joplin's band) and Malvina Reynolds. Levin attended San Jose State University and performed with numerous artists including Jerry Garcia and the Black Mountain Boys and his own band, The Piney Creek Ramblers with his brother Robbie Levin.

In 2017, Levin's former band People! decided to come back together to start recording their new album which includes the single Eve of Destruction. Current members include, Gene Mason, Denny Fridkin, Robb Levin, Geoff Levin, and John Tristao.

Career

People!
Levin is the former member of the rock band People!.

Producing
Levin helped produced the album Tusks & Horns for artist Mayuka Thaïs which was released in May 2014. Levin and Thaïs performed the single off the album Tusks & Horns at the Global March for Elephants & Rhinos on October 4, 2014.

Collaboration
For her exhibition held at the Carnegie Art Museum, Levin collaborated with artist Bobbie Moline-Kramer by adding auditory experience to complement the art pieces.

Personal life
In 1975, Levin met Diana Canova and in 1976 they were married. They divorced in 1979. In 1993, Levin married Lisa London and had two children, son Collin, and daughter Savannah. Levin and London divorced in 2006. Levin was a Scientologist for 30 years, even having served in the Sea Org., Scientology's religious order, aboard the Apollo.

Discography

Film

Television

TV movies

Documentary

Videos

Albums

Singles

Video interviews
 "An interview with Mat Gleason, Coagula Art Journal, Modern Art Blitz, Bobbie Moline-Kramer and Geoff Levin" 2017
 "The Jerry Bovino Show - Rock and Roll Brothers with Robbie Levin, Geoff Levin, and Host Jerry Bovino" 2017

Awards

References

External links

Official Geoff Levin Site

Official Celestial Navigations Site

American folk guitarists
Songwriters from California
Musicians from Los Angeles
1945 births
Living people